Naoum al-Labbaki (1875 – 21 October 1924 ) was a Lebanese journalist and former speaker of the Lebanese Parliament.

He was born in Baabdat, in the Mount Lebanon Mutasarrifate then immigrated to America, where he established the newspaper "Al-Manahir". He returned to Lebanon in 1908, and continued publishing the newspaper in Beirut in the village of Baabdat. After the First World War, he was elected as a deputy in the Lebanese Representative Council and then as its speaker in 1923 and he continued in this position until his death on 21 October 1924.

References 

Lebanese politicians
Legislative speakers of Lebanon
1875 births
1924 deaths
Emigrants from the Ottoman Empire to the United States